The 2003 Spanish motorcycle Grand Prix was the third round of the 2003 MotoGP Championship. It took place on the weekend of 9–11 May 2003 at the Circuito de Jerez.

MotoGP classification

250 cc classification

125 cc classification

Championship standings after the race (motoGP)

Below are the standings for the top five riders and constructors after round three has concluded.

Riders' Championship standings

Constructors' Championship standings

 Note: Only the top five positions are included for both sets of standings.

References

Spanish motorcycle Grand Prix
Spanish
Motorcycle Grand Prix